Kumbak is a Dutch amusement ride manufacturing company. In addition to manufacturing its own rides, the company primarily specialises in changing existing rides and attractions, originally made by other manufacturers.

History

Kumbak (originally Kumbak Coasters) was formed on 14 November 2001 just months after the bankruptcy of Vekoma, a roller coaster manufacturer. The company was founded by nine former employees of Vekoma. The company expanded to a total of 16 employees less than a month later. Kumbak'''s first project was to design a passenger evacuation platform for Morey's Piers' Great Nor' Easter Suspended Looping Coaster. Since then the company has performed a complete upgrade on several rides originally made by different manufacturers, as well as designing their own water coaster and dark rides.

ProjectsGreat Nor' Easter, Morey's Piers (2003) – a passenger evacuation platform was constructed for the Vekoma Suspended Looping CoasterSpace Invader 2, Pleasure Beach Blackpool (2004) – replacement of a portion of track, the lift hill, vehicles, ride controls and brakes on the 1984 Zierer roller coasterWereld 3 Stalen Monsters, Nederlands Spoorwegmuseum (2005) – a dark ride designed and constructed by KumbakPython, Efteling (2005) – the Arrow Dynamics-designed, Vekoma roller coaster had its trains replaced with Kumbak trains, however due to multiple problems they were replaced later by new trains from Vekoma.Grand National, Pleasure Beach Blackpool (2006) – a new braking and ride control system was added to this Möbius Loop roller coasterPhantom's Revenge, Kennywood (2006) – a new braking and ride control system was added to this Arrow Dynamics/Chance Morgan hypercoasterDe Vliegende Hollander, Efteling (2007) – complete design and construction of this water coasterStampida, PortAventura Park, PortAventura World (2007) – addition of 4 new trains as well as a new braking and ride control system for this Custom Coasters International wooden roller coasterTomahawk, PortAventura Park (2007) – Custom Coasters International wooden roller coaster which had its braking and ride control system replacedMonkey Rail, Ouwehands Dierenpark (2008) – redesign of this 1979 Mack Rides Monorail to meet current operational requirementsMiraculum, Vienna Prater (2008) – a 5-D theatreVienna Airlines, Vienna Prater (2008) – a 5-D theatreHornet, Wonderland Park (2008) – upgrade of original Vekoma ride control systemSea Viper, Sea World (2009) – a new train to replace the original 1982 Arrow Dynamics train. The project began in 2005.Robin Hood, Walibi Holland (2010) – new restraints for this Vekoma wooden roller coasterRutschebanen, Dyrehavsbakken (2010) – overall upgrade to this wooden roller coaster from the early 1930sArkham Asylum – Shock Therapy, Warner Bros. Movie World (2012) – a new train for this Vekoma Suspended Looping CoasterT3'', Kentucky Kingdom (2015) - A new 14 seater train was provided for the 2015 season, when the coaster was refurbished and brought back from a 4 year operation hiatus. A second train was provided for the 2016 season, although only one has in use since June 2018 as a precautionary measure after the ride's pair of trains suffered a low-speed station collision.

List of roller coasters

As of 2019, Kumbak has built 1 roller coaster around the world.

See also
 :Category:Roller coasters manufactured by Kumbak

References

External links
 

Amusement ride manufacturers
Manufacturing companies established in 2001
Companies based in Limburg (Netherlands)
Manufacturing companies of the Netherlands
Roller coaster manufacturers